Ambanja is a district in northern Madagascar. It is a part of Diana Region and borders the districts of Ambilobe to the east, Bealanana to the south and Analalava to the south-west.

Communes
The district is further divided into 18 communes:

 Ambalahonko
 Ambanja
 Ambodimanga
 Ambohimarina
 Ankatafa
 Ankingameloko
 Anorotsangana
 Antafiambotry
 Antranokarany
 Antsakoamanondro
 Antsatsaka
 Antsirabe
 Bemanevika Haut Sambirano
 Bemaneviky Ouest
 Djangoa
 Maherivaratra
 Marotolana
 Marovato

References and notes

Districts of Diana Region